Nicholas De Ruiz (February, 1871 – June 21, 1959) was an American actor. He appeared in 36 films between 1920 and 1938.

He was born in Santa Barbara, California and died in Los Angeles, California, aged 88.

Selected filmography

External links

1871 births
1959 deaths
American male film actors
American male silent film actors
20th-century American male actors